This is a list of Belgian television related events from 2004.

Events
15 February - Xandee is selected to represent Belgium at the 2004 Eurovision Song Contest with her song "1 Life". She is selected to be the forty-sixth Belgian Eurovision entry during Eurosong held at the VRT Studios in Schelle.
12 December - Joeri Fransen wins the second season of Idool. His debut single, "Ya 'Bout to Find Out" reaches number one in the Ultratop 50 two weeks later.

Debuts

Television shows

1990s
Samson en Gert (1990–present)
Familie (1991–present)
Wittekerke (1993-2008)
Thuis (1995–present)
Wizzy & Woppy (1999-2007)

2000s
Big Brother (2000-2007)
Idool (2003-2011)

Ending this year

Births

Deaths

See also
2004 in Belgium

References